Vejovis or Vejove (  or Vēdiovis; rare Vēive  or Vēdius) was a Roman god of Etruscan origins.

Representation and worship
Vejovis was portrayed as a young man, holding a bunch of arrows, pilum, (or lightning bolts) in his hand, and accompanied by a goat.  Romans believed that Vejovis was one of the first gods to be born. He was a god of healing, and became associated with the Greek Asclepius. He was mostly worshipped in Rome and Bovillae in Latium. On the Capitoline Hill and on the Tiber Island, temples were erected in his honour.

Though he was associated with volcanic eruptions, his original role and function is obscured to us. He is occasionally identified with Apollo and young Jupiter.

Aulus Gellius, in the Noctes Atticae, written almost a millennium after; speculated that Vejovis was an ill-omened counterpart of Jupiter; compare Summanus. Aulus Gellius observes that the particle ve- that prefixes the name of the god also appears in Latin words such as vesanus, "insane," and thus interprets the name Vejovis as the anti-Jove.

Temple
He had a temple between the two peaks of the Capitoline Hill in Rome, where his statue carried a bundle of arrows and stood next to a statue of a she-goat.

Sacrifices
In spring, multiple goats were sacrificed to him to avert plagues.  Gellius informs us that Vejovis received the sacrifice of a female goat, sacrificed ritu humano; this obscure phrase could either mean "after the manner of a human sacrifice" or "in the manner of a burial." These offerings were less about the animal sacrificed and more about the soul sacrificed.

Festivals
Vejovis had three festivals in the Roman Calendar: on 1 January, 7 March, and 21 May.

References 

Roman gods
Etruscan gods
Vengeance gods
Underworld gods
Health gods
Asclepius
Plague gods
Jovian deities